The 1996–97 Sussex County Football League season was the 72nd in the history of Sussex County Football League a football competition in England.

Division One

Division One featured 18 clubs which competed in the division last season, along with two new clubs, promoted from Division Two:
Saltdean United
Selsey

League table

Division Two

Division Two featured 16 clubs which competed in the division last season, along with two new clubs:
Crawley Down Village, promoted from Division Three
Crowborough Athletic, relegated from Division One

League table

Division Three

Division Three featured 14 clubs which competed in the division last season, along with two new clubs:
Ansty Rangers
Uckfield Town, joined from the Mid-Sussex League

League table

References

1996-97
1996–97 in English football leagues